Axis & Allies: Pacific is a strategy board game produced by Hasbro under the Avalon Hill name brand. Released on July 31, 2001 and designed by Larry Harris, the designer of the original Axis & Allies game, Axis & Allies: Pacific allows its players to recreate the Pacific Theater of World War II.

While it is a strategic board game with a historical setting, it is not designed to be a historical simulation. Instead, it is designed for a stream-lined ease of play and a balancing of the two powers rather than for historical accuracy.

In 2002 Axis & Allies: Pacific won the Origins Award for Best Historical Board Game of 2001.

Setting
(content from the outside bottom panel of the Axis & Allies: Pacific gamebox)

December 7, 1941

Japan is about to launch one of the most infamous preemptive strikes in military history. Their target, the American Pacific Fleet moored in Hawaii at Pearl Harbor. In the weeks to come, other battles will add to the sting of Allied defeats - Hong Kong, Malaya, the Philippines, Java.

Axis & Allies: Pacific invites you and your opponent to determine the future of the Pacific! How will the Americans counterattack after Japan's initial onslaught? Will Japan succeed in gaining the right resources of the East Indies? Can these be held long enough for the Allies to grow weary of the war? How will British forces fare in the embattled jungles of Burma? You will decide.

Naval strategy, as well as prudent economic moves, is critical in building and sustaining your naval forces. Warships, transports, ground forces and air power will all be needed if you are to control the Pacific. Good Luck. The fate of the world is in your hands!

For two or three players, aged 12 and up. Contains a Gameboard Map, 345 Plastic Playing Pieces, National Control Markers, National Production Charts, a Battle Board Chart, Industrial Production Certificates (IPCs), 12 Dice, Plastic Chips (Gray and Red), and a Gameplay Manual. Rated at a Challenging Complexity Level by Hasbro.

Game play
The game is designed to be played by 2-3 players, representing the nation-economies of Japan, the U.S, China, ANZAC, and India (Great Britain) respectively, with the latter four groups composing the Allied forces. Both sides compete with units for control of territories producing IPCs (Industrial Production Certificates) good toward the purchase of most units.

The overall goal for winning the game differs for each player. The Allies (the British and America players) must either conquer and occupy the territory of Japan for a turn, or they must reduce Japan's IPC income to 9 or less by conquering other territories to win the game. The Japan player's goals are more open-ended: Japan must conquer and occupy any of the Allied capitals on the gameboard (the territories of India, New South Wales, or USA), or Japan must accumulate 22 victory points (Japan scores one point for every 10 IPCs collected at the end of its turn).

Each player starts out with a slightly different arsenal of units to deploy.
Industrial ComplexConstructs units. Can only be built by the United States. All capitals and Hawaii start with an Industrial Complex. Cannot be destroyed.
InfantryAvailable to all players, these units are cheap but weak. Better at defending than attacking under normal circumstances, these units may still be used to good advantage (as more than Cannon-fodder) by a tactical player. Their movement is the most limited of any in the expansion. The U.S. can build special infantry called "Marines". Marines are better in amphibious assaults.
MarinesUS specific troops. Specialized in amphibious assaults, it has 2 attack instead of 1 attack when attacking.
ArtilleryAvailable to all players, artillery units are slightly more effective than infantry, but their greatest benefit comes when used in concert with infantry: for every matching artillery, each matching infantry's attack roll is doubled, equalling the attack roll of artillery.
ArmorAvailable to all players, armor units are typically rare, but are the most effective and costly land unit, with a good attack roll and a moderate defensive roll. They have the added advantage of being able to cross two land territories, by blitzing, as compared to the infantry and artillery's movement of one land territory.
Anti-aircraftAvailable to all players, antiaircraft units costs as much as a tank, but are marginally useful only when defending against enemy air attacks. Each player starts with one in their capital territory.
Bombers Available to all players, bomber units are rare but are the best in land offenses. They also have the ability to force a player to surrender IPCs to the bank by a Strategic Bombing Raid (SBR).
Fighters Available to all players, fighters play an important role in the game. Strong in both offense and defense and with the ability to be used as cannon fodder for SBRs.
Battleships Strongest ship available. Takes two hits to destroy.
Aircraft Carriers Capital ship able to hold two fighters. Strong defense but weak attack.
Destroyers Available to all players, destroyers are used for disabling submarine advantages. For the Japanese player, they can be used as transports.
Submarine Ship with a special first strike rule that lets it sink ships without being fired back at.
Transports Ship used to transport units. No attack and weak defense.

References

External links
 
 Axis & Allies: Pacific at axisandallies.org

Avalon Hill games
Axis & Allies
Board games introduced in 2001
Larry Harris (game designer) games
Origins Award winners
World War II board wargames